The following is a list of films produced in the Kannada film industry in India in 1968, presented in alphabetical order.

See also
 Kannada films of 1967
 Kannada films of 1969

References

External links
 Kannada Movies of 1968's at the Internet Movie Database
 http://www.bharatmovies.com/kannada/info/moviepages.htm
 http://www.kannadastore.com/

1968
Kannada
Films, Kannada